Johannes Cornelis Princen (21 November 1925 – 2 February 2002), also known as Poncke Princen, was a Dutch anti-Nazi fighter and activist.  In 1948, he deserted, joining the pro-independence guerrillas in what was then the Dutch Indies.

He lived the rest of his life in Indonesia, where he became a prominent human rights activist and political dissident under various dictatorial regimes and consequently spent considerable time in detention.

Early life
Princen and his three siblings were the children of free-thinking parents with anarchist tendencies. His great-grandfather had been a deserter from military service, who had long been chased by the law and whose life was described in a book by Anton Coolen.

Despite his upbringing, the young Princen conceived an interest in Catholicism under the influence of the parents of his mother, Theresia Princen-Van der Lee. In 1939, he entered the Holy Ghost Seminary at Weert – where he was followed by his younger brother Kees Princen, with whom he was to maintain correspondence throughout all the vicissitudes of his life. It was while he was at the seminary that Nazi Germany invaded and occupied the Netherlands in 1940.

Princen did not become a priest. In 1942, being only 17 years old, he was accepted as an economic counselor at Teppemaand Vargroup Groothandel voor Chemische Producten, a chemical company based  at The Hague. However, he did not keep this position for long, either, being determined to take up arms against the occupiers of his country.

Nazi imprisonment and liberation
In 1943, Princen was arrested by the German occupation authorities in Maastricht, while trying to get to Spain – from where he intended to travel to Britain and enlist in an Allied army fighting the Nazis. He was convicted by the occupation authorities of "attempting to aid the enemy" and in early 1944 was sent to the notorious Vught Camp.

On D-Day, he was transferred to the Kriegswehrmachtgefängnis (Wehrmacht Military Prison) at Utrecht. While there, he entertained fellow-prisoners by reading aloud chapters from a favorite book, Pastoor Poncke ("Pastor Poncke") by Jan Eekhout. Thereby, he acquired the nickname "Poncke" which he was to keep for the rest of his life.

Later, he was transferred to the prison camp at Amersfoort  and from there to Beckum, Germany. Altogether, before being finally liberated by the arrival of Allied forces, he had passed through no less than seven Nazi prisons and camps. Princen had to be in Nazi prison from 1944 to 1945.

Directly upon being freed from Nazi imprisonment, Princen joined the Stoottroepen Regiment Brabant (Brabant Stormtroop Regiment), based in the southern Dutch province of Brabant.

In 1945, he also worked for the newly founded Bureau voor Nationale Veiligheid (Bureau of National Security :nl:Bureau Nationale Veiligheid), forerunner of the present Dutch Security Service – at the time mainly involved in hunting down collaborators and war criminals, but also keeping under surveillance those natives of the Dutch Indies, resident in the Netherlands, who were sympathetic with the rebellion against Dutch rule that was spreading in their homeland.

To reluctant colonial service
In March 1946, Princen, like other young Dutchmen at the time, got a call-up order. He was to join the ranks of the Royal Netherlands Army and take part in what Dutch official histories still sometimes call "Police Actions" (politionele acties) but which became better known as the Indonesian National Revolution.

Reluctant to take part in that war, Princen fled to France – but upon hearing that his mother was ill, came back and was arrested by the Marechaussee and detained at Schoonhoven. On December 28, 1946, he was put on board the troop ship Sloterdijk – the last he would see of his homeland, except for a brief visit many decades later.

Also aboard the Sloterdijk was the young Communist Piet van Staveren, also a reluctant conscript who would eventually desert and join the Indonesian rebels. Both of them did meet during the trip and sharing their anti-colonial ideas

A crucial decision
When he arrived in the Indies, Princen was charged with desertion. On 22 October 1947, he was sentenced to twelve months' imprisonment for desertion, but he was returned to active service after four months at the Tjisaroea Prison Camp, the remainder of his sentence being suspended.

He was increasingly unhappy with the haughty and contemptuous attitude of fellow soldiers to the local population, and he was present at some bloody incidents which greatly increased his disaffection. As he many years later explained, "An adolescence under Nazi rule and two years in German imprisonment has directed my life and made me fight against cruelty. I thought the Indonesians were right. I thought they should be the ones to decide their own future. ... ... I was disgusted with the Dutch killing people I admired”.

In January 1948, the United Nations brokered a fragile cease-fire, but almost immediately both sides violated the truce in multiple incidents and the Dutch forces made preparations for a new operation against the rebel forces.

It was at this time, while being on leave at Sukabumi, that Princen took on 25 September 1948, the irrevocable step which shaped the rest of his life. He crossed the Line of Demarcation into rebel-held territory, and via Semarang reached Yogyakarta, the provisional capital of the self-proclaimed Indonesian Republic – where the suspicious Indonesian nationalists promptly threw him into their own prison.

As Indonesian guerrilla
In December 1948, the Dutch army launched Operation Kraai (Dutch for "Crow"), swiftly captured Yogyakarta, and imprisoned Sukarno and other most nationalist leaders  (see Politionele acties and  Operation Kraai).

During the assault upon the provisional capital, the nationalist rebels released Princen from their prison and gave him the chance to enlist in the Tentara Nasional Indonesia (TNI, Indonesian Republican Forces).

When he joined them, the pro-independence forces' fortunes seemed at their nadir, with their political leadership captured and most of the territory of Indonesia under a re-established Dutch military rule. Nonetheless, they conducted an intensive guerrilla campaign and gained considerable international sympathy and support.

Princen was fully committed to his new cause, seeing front-line service under Kemal Idris and taking part in the fighting retreat of the Siliwangi Division under then-Colonel A. H. Nasution, from Central Java to "guerrilla cantons" established in West Java – an action which came to be known as the Long March Siliwangi (derived from the famed Long March of Mao Zedong's Chinese Communist Party). He was appointed staff officer in the Second Brigade of  Grup Purwakarta, active in the environs of the city of Purwakarta.
 
On one occasion in the beginning of August 1949, Dutch troops shot Princen's wife Odah, with Princen narrowly avoiding being killed. When asked in a press interview many years later "Did you actually shoot at Dutch soldiers? Did you kill some of them?" he answered forthrightly "Yes, I did."

Princen quickly became famous (or notorious, according to point of view). In a struggle decided as much in the international public opinion and diplomatic forums as in the field, the presence of an articulate ex-Dutch soldier with an impeccable anti-Nazi past in the rebel ranks had an obvious political and propaganda significance.

Princen's act aroused bitter hostility against him from his homeland, which was still much in evidence half a century later. Some even accused him of having allowed himself to be used as bait to draw Dutch soldiers into an ambush. A Dutch court martial sentenced him to death in absentia, and when the Dutch finally decided to evacuate Indonesia, they made a strong demand for his extradition.

However, by then freed Sukarno, the founding father and the first president of Indonesia, would not hear of it.

Princen's career as a rebel and dissident was, however, far from over. Due to his rebellious nature and unique passion for standing up for the discriminated and downtrodden, he was imprisoned repeatedly, both by Sukarno and by Sukarno's rival and successor Suharto, spending a total of eight and a half years in prison.

The decoration he got from Sukarno – a small five-pointed bronze star on which were etched the words "Pahlawan Gerilja" (Guerrilla Hero), and which Princen conspicuously displayed until the end of his days – was to give him at least some protection from the most harsh forms of repression to which successive Indonesian regimes resorted against many other dissidents and political opponents.

As dissident parliamentarian, political prisoner
Soon after the war Princen got married again – this time to a Dutch woman named Janneke Marckmann (until 1971) and later to Sri Mulyati, who was to remain his companion until his death. All together he had four children: Ratnawati, Iwan Hamid, Nicolaas and Wilanda.

His desire to "immerse himself in Indonesia" was also manifested in a conversion to Islam, the predominant religion in Indonesian society. Asked why he had changed his religion, he later explained  to a visitor: "I wanted to feel a part of what everyone else was doing". In later life, his name was on some formal occasions preceded by the Muslim honorific Hajji, usually bestowed upon those who had gone on pilgrimage to Mecca.

Between 1950 and 1953 Princen was an official at the Indonesian Immigration Office. In his free time, he toured Java by motor-bike, earning for himself a case of skin cancer that disfigured him in later life until friends got the money together for skin grafts.

As a parliamentarian he repeatedly posed uncomfortable questions to the Sukarno Government, on such issues as the unequal division of national resources and income between the central island of Java and the outlying islands. He was apparently one of the "obstructing parliamentarians" whom Sukarno found annoying and whose activity was among the factors which finally led the President to replace the Western-type parliamentary system with "guided democracy" in 1959.

Even before then, Princen's outspoken criticism caused him to be arrested and imprisoned in 1957–58. And he spent Sukarno's final years, characterized by increasingly violent power struggles in Indonesia, again serving a prison term 1962–66.

As Human rights activist
Having come to strongly oppose Sukarno, Princen – like quite a few other dissidents – initially placed some hopes in Suharto, who overthrew him following the 1965 attempted coup d'état and whose coming to power had the incidental effect of getting Princen released from prison after four years.

Such hopes were all too soon dashed, when the Suharto regime proved both extremely brutal and highly corrupt: "My opinion of Mr. Suharto changed at the moment he started gathering as much money as he could for himself."

In the late 1960s, Princen was a correspondent for Netherlands Radio and several Dutch newspapers. This was directly connected with his work as a human rights activist, in which he was to spend most of his time and energy for the remainder of his life and through which he was to gain fame (and in government and army circles, notoriety).

In 1966 Princen founded and headed Lembaga Pembela Hak-Hak Azasi Manusia (Indonesian Institute for the Defense of Human Rights). It was the first specifically HR organization to be created in the country, and which was to handle many high-profile human rights cases during the years of the Suharto dictatorship and provide a reliable alternate source of news to Western journalists in Jakarta.

This was actually the very time when the new regime was engaged in the systematic mass killing of hundreds of thousands of supposed communist supporters – though the full extent of the horror was unknown at the time, either in Indonesia itself or abroad. (Princen would be among those who would eventually reveal it).

Among the earlier campaigns which Princen conducted was on behalf of the left-wing writer Pramoedya Ananta Toer, imprisoned and  tortured by the Suharto regime. At the end of 1969 he published, jointly with the journalist Jopie Lasut, an extensive report on the mass murder of Communist sympathizers at Purwodadi in Middle Java – for which Princen and Lasut were promptly arrested and interrogated.

This was followed in the early 1970s by Princen's prominent role in creating a larger organization, the Indonesian Legal Aid Institute (LBHI), where he rubbed shoulders with many other human rights figures including Adnan Buyung Nasution, Frans Winarta, Besar Mertokusumo, Yap Thiam Hien, Victor D. Sibarani, Mochtar Lubis, Albert Hasibuan and members of the younger generation of activists.

The eulogy published after his death by the Indonesian oppositional news and commentary website Laksamana.Net noted that
Princen's work as a lawyer never earned him much in the way of material wealth. Unlike other prominent human rights lawyers whose careers benefited from their high profile on the human rights front, Princen remained a figure whose only interest was in defending the rights of the small. Visitors to his succession of small offices in the early '90s remember calling on him to find themselves welcomed by Princen resting in his underwear, and his close friends recall that it was seldom that they were able to leave before parting with a contribution to help pay his driver or his phone bill.

Still, the same obituary also notes that, however widely respected Princen  was, "toward the end of his career, much of his work was taken over by younger Indonesians, some of whom felt it inappropriate that the human rights struggle should be led by a man who was still, in their eyes, a foreigner".

Prisoner again, labor advocate, political reformer 
As under Sukarno, Princen was under Suharto jailed several times – mainly on charges of organizing illegal political protests.

In January 1974, the visit of the Japanese Prime Minister Tanaka Kakuei sparked rioting by students and urban poor in Jakarta. Ostensibly fuelled by resentment of Japanese exploitation of Indonesia's economy, and to start with possibly encouraged tacitly by some Army commanders, this so-called "Malari Affair" soon "got out of hand" and came to express hitherto repressed popular resentment about the growing gap between rich and poor in Indonesian society and the bureaucratic capitalists connected with the regime.

Involved as an outspoken human rights activist, Princen was among those who found themselves behind bars in the aftermath, and spent the next two years (1974–1976) in prison. Many other dissidents, such as Marsillam Simanjuntak, who would emerge as the 'Mr. Clean' of post-Suharto Indonesian politics, had the same fate.

In early 1990 Princen had a major role in founding the Merdeka Labor Union (Serikat Buruh Merdeka – "Merdeka" literally means "Independence") – together with Dita Indah Sari, a noted Indonesian labor activist and Amnesty International Prisoner of Conscience. He conducted extensive correspondence with the International Labour Organization (ILO) regarding the conditions of Indonesian workers. Max White, Princen's friend and coworker, stated that "Poncke believed that  'Labor rights are human rights', he saw no distinction".

In 1992 he won the prestigious Yap Thiam Hien Human Rights Award – named for the Chinese Indonesian lawyer Yap Thiam Hien, a fellow human rights activist.

In the early 1990s, he was also a founding member of the Petition of Fifty, a movement for democratic reform which included conservative military figures who had fallen out with Suharto and which for the first time in decades raised a real challenge to his rule. Along with other members of the group including Ali Sadikin and Hoegeng, Princen again found himself persona non-grata with the regime, although he joked to his visitors that by that time he was "too old to put in jail again".

In 1996 he was involved in protests against Suharto's crackdown on the Indonesian Democratic Party (PRD). Visiting delegations of international human rights organizations at the time found him "a source of accurate information about those who were attacked at the PRD headquarters".

Much of his time in the following years was spent in writing open letters to President Suharto, on such issues as demanding the abolition of  extrajudicial bodies, asking for answers about "disappearances" in East Timor (and in the capital Jakarta itself), and affirming that political change needed to take place before the Indonesian economy could recover. His once-isolated legal aid organization had become part of a large and growing network of NGO's working for political and social change.

He became widely known as "the man in the wheelchair at political rallies, who is rarely absent from a courtroom during political trials, and at mention of whose name students around the country were smiling with admiration.

A testimony of Princen's activities in that period – a man already more than seventy years old and with a rapidly deteriorating health – was provided by Ed McWilliams, a former officer of the US Foreign Service presently residing at Falls Church, Virginia:

While working in the U.S. Embassy from 1996 to 1999, I met frequently with J. C. Princen – often "summoned" to his office to be pressed to follow up on some outrage by the Indonesian (or U.S.) government, or sometimes simply to chat about events.
Among many inspiring memories of Princen one stands out: there was a trial session for one of the Suharto regime's young "enemies" at the Central District Court in Jakarta. Shortly after it had begun, the normally wheelchair-bound Princen appeared to join friends of the defendant. As the trial session was taking place on the third floor, and there was no elevator, many of us were mystified as to how he had made it to the courtroom.  
As the session ended, it became apparent. With the assistance of friends he had climbed the multiple flights of stairs. I was honoured to be asked among others to help him as he made the slow, painful descent back to the ground floor. His willingness to sacrifice for others, his wisdom and his love for the people of Indonesia, especially the poor, made him a tower of strength for Indonesians in their darkest days.  
I recall also a conversation in which I joked that it was strange that he had been jailed by both President Sukarno and President Suharto, and that he had managed also to irritate President Habibie. I said it seemed he was consistently against all Indonesian governments. 
With his playful smile he responded, "No, you have it wrong; it is that I am always on the side of the people."  I recall finally what he called his "anthem", Edith Piaf's haunting Non, je ne regrette rien. Truly, he had nothing to regret throughout a long and noble life".
Ironically, the same Piaf song had been taken up, for diametrically opposite reasons, by members of the French Foreign Legion fighting to preserve colonial rule in Algeria.

Princen and East Timor
In 1994 Princen flew to Geneva to testify before the United Nations Commission on Human Rights about the use of torture by Indonesian forces in East Timor and Aceh – one of the peak moments of his involvement in the brutal struggle going on in both places.

Princen stood out from other Indonesian reformers and dissidents  in his early stand in support of East Timorese self-determination, a cause which was for long taboo even in the most progressive circles in Indonesia, where nationalism reigned supreme. His sympathy for the rebellious Timorese was due to much the same reasons which led him in youth to oppose German occupation of the Netherlands and later to renounce his Dutch homeland and throw in his lot with the Indonesian rebels.

José Amorim Dias, a later senior member of the East Timor Foreign Service gave the following reminiscence:

"(...) Like thousands of Timorese students and activists, I lived and studied in Indonesia for some years since 1980s. In the course of those darkest years of our history, we came to know this great but humble human being, full of humour and compassion, who later became a very good friend of the East Timorese People. He was HJC Princen but known popularly among friends as Poncke.

"When the rest of Indonesia was silent and indifferent before the tragedy of East Timor, Princen opened his 'doors and windows' to the persecuted Timorese students, at the risk of his own life. Working only with his right hand, he typed endless letters of appeal to the civilian and military authorities to protect those alleged political prisoners in East Timor and Indonesia.

"In spite of his fragile health, a couple of times, he flew and spoke out at the UN Commission of Human Rights in Geneva on behalf of those defenseless people.

"His activities, however, drew suspicion and anger from the authorities. His phone was constantly tapped. Anonymous calls arrived at his office with insult, intimidation and threat. He was summoned for questioning in the police headquarters. But Princen remained with firmness and determination in his struggle for the voiceless people.

"As the political situation worsened day by day in East Timor, hundreds of young people, students and activists fled East Timor and arrived in Java. Many of them sought political asylum in foreign embassies in Jakarta. Those who stayed behind sought refuge among Indonesian friends. Several took refuge in the house of Princen for months. 'He took care of us, gave us food and shelter', one of the students recalled.

"After the 1991 Santa Cruz Massacre in the Timorese capital Dili, Princen gave sanctuary in his home to five young Timorese who had fled their homeland. A stand-off with the Indonesian military followed, but he successfully negotiated with the Jakarta military commander, General Hendro-priono (then perceived as a liberal harbinger of reform)  for their safe passage to Jakarta airport, from whence they traveled to freedom in Portugal".

Princen had some contact with the Timorese leader Xanana Gusmão (later president of independent East Timor) even when Gusmão was still leading the guerilla struggle in East Timor's mountains. After Gusmão's capture by the Indonesian forces in 1992 and his transfer to a Jakarta Prison, the two embarked on a regular correspondence and developed a friendship, though being able to have a (highly emotional) face-to-face meeting only after Reformasi movement gained force in 1998. Thereafter, they continued to meet regularly, discussing the evolution of the democratic struggle in Indonesia.

The Timorese leader's Australian wife, Kirsty Sword, also knew Princen from her work with the Timorese underground after 1990. After his death, she recalled Princen telling her: "In 1949 Sukarno refused to hand me over to the Dutch, but now Suharto would be happy to do it and get rid of me." She remarked, however: "Despite being a vocal critic, Princen had enormous respect in Indonesia, and was considered almost untouchable."

Attitudes to Princen in the Netherlands
Though branded a traitor, Princen was never completely cut off from his original homeland. The death sentence passed on him absentia was no longer in force, but he was officially considered to be banned from entering the country, having forfeited not only his Dutch citizenship but even the right to visit.

By one account, he did briefly and unobtrusively visit the Netherlands in the 1970s, while in Europe on a human rights mission. By other accounts, he met with family members just across the German border, and on a later date a TV crew took footage of him standing over the border itself, one foot daringly extended on to Dutch soil.

Throughout the years Princen maintained correspondence with his younger brother Kees, as well as with his mother, who in the 1940s had tried to intercede for him with the Dutch military authorities – a correspondence eventually deposited, together with many of his other papers, at the Amsterdam-based International Institute of Social History (IISH).

As mentioned, he was a valued reporter for various Dutch communications media. Moreover, some Dutch ministers are reported to have tacitly asked him for information on the East Timor situation, on which he had detailed information not available elsewhere.

Interest and controversy over "The Poncke Princen Affair" were re-ignited in the Netherlands by the 1989 publication of Princen's autobiographical book Poncke Princen: Een kwestie van kiezen ("Poncke Princen, a Matter of Choice"), which had been narrated to Joyce van Fenema.
 
Dutch left-wing activists defended Princen strongly, and asserted that his continuing rejection was an indication of the country's refusing to come to terms with its dark colonial heritage.

It was the associations of Dutch veterans who had fought in the Indies who remained to the last the most intransigent in their hatred of "Princen The Traitor", undiminished by the passage of half a century. They voiced a vociferous protest whenever the possibility of his visiting the Netherlands was mooted.

Like the American Vietnam War veterans in a later generation, the Dutch veterans felt neglected. They felt their sacrifice was ignored and forgotten by the country for which they had fought – and they felt any rehabilitation of Princen to be the ultimate insult. Princen himself expressed understanding for the veterans' anger; however, he stated that he considered being granted a visa to be an admission by the Netherlands of having been in the wrong in 1945–49.

Not quite all veterans were mobilized against him. In 1993 the journalist and former colonial soldier  cordially toured together with Princen the battlefields where they had fought on opposing sides, and made a documentary. However, Vader's attempt to secure Princen a visa to visit the Netherlands failed, the government claiming that war veterans had threatened to kill him if he tried to enter the Netherlands.

In 1994, then Dutch Foreign Minister Hans van Mierlo finally overruled the officials at the Dutch Embassy in Jakarta and personally authorised the issuing of a visa to Princen "on humanitarian grounds" – on condition (which was kept) that he maintain "a low profile" during his visit to the Netherlands and devote it mainly to meeting family members who he had not seen for many decades.

As it turned out, this visit took place at nearly the last moment when Princen's fast-failing health could still stand the long trip. A planned second visit in 1998, which again aroused protests by war veterans, was prevented by his stroke that year.

Only after Princen's death in 2002 did a Dutch cabinet minister, Jan Pronk, officially pay a cautious tribute to him. "Poncke Princen was no hero, martyr or saint, but first and foremost a human rights activist," the minister told Radio Netherlands

In February 2009 the documentary '"The White Guerrilla" made by the Dutch research-journalist Bart Nijpels appeared on Dutch television (Katholieke Radio Omroep), reconstructing his life and giving an impartial opinion about his political choices. The documentary was received positively in general by the Dutch public.

Princen's main quote in life was always: The Consequence of a Consequence is a Consequence.

Deteriorating health and final years
In March 1998, the 73-year-old Princen – on a wheelchair and undergoing what was described as "mutilating surgery" for his skin cancer – was among some 150 activists who openly violated a ban on political protests in the capital Jakarta, demonstrating against the undemocratic re-election of Suharto and defying the police to arrest them. As it turned out, that was a last effort in the long struggle, and Suharto finally fell from power two months later.

However, later in the same year Princen suffered the first in a series of near-fatal strokes and remained bedridden, tended by his daughter Wilanda Princen, for his remaining years. Yet "his luminous spirit shone through his crippled wreck of a body, and he continued his work as before", as Australian journalist Jill Jolliffe who knew him well put it. 
 
On 22 February 2002, Princen suffered his final stroke and died at the age of 76, in his home on Jl. Arjuna III No. 24 in Pisangan Baru, Utan Kayu Selatan in East Jakarta. He is survived by his wife, Sri Mulyati, and four children – two sons and two daughters (some of them residing in the Netherlands).

Before his death, Princen had specifically requested that he be buried alongside ordinary people in the public cemetery at Pondok Kelapa  in East Jakarta, and renounced the place in the Heroes' Cemetery at Kalibata to which he was entitled by the Guerrilla Star which Sukarno gave him.

Many friends from the years of his struggle against the excesses of successive Indonesian governments attended his funeral – "from the movements of 1945 [Indonesian Independence struggle], 1966 [Fall of Sukarno] and 1974 [Malari Affair]". There were noted activists and human rights lawyers such as Luhut Pangaribuan, Muchtar Pakpahan, Hariman Siregar, Jopy Lasut and Gurmilang Kartasasmita.

His American friend Max White remarked: "When I learned who was at the memorial service, and at the mosque and cemetery, I was struck by how wide a swath of Indonesia mourned him: from former 'tapols' [political prisoners] to members of the government and military".

"We will miss him deeply ... a person of such fine quality, rich life experience and persistence in defending his belief in human rights," said Munir, Princen's young colleague at the Commission for Missing Persons and Victims and Violence (Kontras).

He was also mourned in the East Timorese capital Dili, where Xanana Gusmão – soon to be inaugurated president – said that he was deeply saddened by Princen's death: "He was my friend, and he encouraged us in our struggle. East Timor owes a lot to him."

The aforementioned Jose Amorim Diaz added: "He was a great friend, a friend who gave us courage and inspiration. A friend who taught us moderation, tolerance and dialogue. Above all, a friend who shared our pain and grief.(...) With immense sadness we bow our heads to this noble man who has devoted his entire life for the cause of Human Rights, Democracy and Peace."

Princen archives in Amsterdam
 – Indonesian poet, left-wing activist and former  political prisoner, who knew Princen  and who presently resides in the Netherlands – collected many Indonesian testimonies and documents for the Amsterdam-based International Institute of Social History.

Among many other Indonesian collections, Poncke Princen's archives were deposited in the institute in 1998, the year when a stroke left him bedridden for his remaining years. They include:

 Correspondence with Kees Princen 1989–96 and with other family members 1944–73
 Diary 1947
 Personal documents 1961, 1963, 1990s
 Letters and other documents on his 70th birthday 1995
 Biographical documents, including reports and notes 1987–92
 Files on his support of the opposition in East Timor 1982–93
 On the activities of the LPHAM 1987–90
 On his trade union activities, including correspondence with the ILO 1990–95
 On politics and political parties in Indonesia 1991–96
 Files concerning Indonesian political prisoners and ex-tapols 1993
 Documents regarding the death of Poncke Princen 2002

Also included are manuscripts and academic papers, such as : 
 `Waarom kreeg J.C. `Poncke' Princen geen visum?, of De last van het koloniaal verleden' (Why did  J.C. `Poncke' Princen get no visa?, or the  burden of the colonial past) by Kaj Hofman, 1994.
 "De affaire-Poncke Princen" (The Poncke Princen Affair) by Julika Vermolen, 1993.
 "Chronologisch overzicht van het bezoek van Poncke Princen aan Nederland" (Chronological overview of Poncke Princen's visit to the Netherlands) made by Jan de Vletter, December 1994.
"De verwerking van de politionele acties" (Working out the politionele acties) by  Job Spierings, Martijn Gunther Moor and Thomas Dirkmaat, 1995.
"Poncke Princen, een gemoedelijke radicaal in Indonesie" (Poncke Princen, a good-mooded radical in Indonesia) by Kees Snoek.
 The unpublished manuscript of a novel about Poncke Princen by Hannah Rambe.

See also
History of Indonesia
Human rights in Indonesia
Indonesian National Revolution
Politionele acties
Royal Netherlands East Indies Army

References

External links
 Princen's photo on the cover of his autobiography, "Een kwestie van kiezen"
 Princen in prison as a deserter in 1947
 Photo of Princen speaking in court
 "Human Rights Campaigner Continues Fight That He Began Decades Ago", interview with Thomas Fuller, International Herald Tribune, March 12, 1998
 "Ponke, a human rights hero, is dead" by Max White,  2002 obituary published by the  East Timor and Indonesia Action Network
 Six obituaries from February 2002 (Ed McWilliams, former US foreign Service Officer, in The Jakarta Post;  Laksamana.Net; The Age (Melbourne); Los Angeles Times; Newsday, US; Berita-Bhinneka (current news about Indonesia)
 Aad Engelfriet (Arcengel)  "Who is  Poncke Princen?" in "Introduction to the History of the Dutch East Indies"
 "Dutch 'traitor' Became A Pro-Timorese Indonesian ", by Jill Jolliffe, Sydney Morning Herald, March 14, 2002
 "Indonesia's Rights Activist HJC Princen Dies at 76", by Eriko Uchida, 23 February 2002
 "Senior human rights activist Haji Johannes Cornelis Princen (76) passed away" in INFID’s Short News Overview No.80: 22 – 28 February 2002
 Hersri Setiawan's eulogy for 'Poncke' Princen in BAHASA Archives
 Directory of the Poncke Princen Archive, International Institute for Social History, Amsterdam
 "A Dissident Life" by Keith Loveard, Asiaweek, 14 June 1991.
Biography in English on Brabantserfgoed.nl

1925 births
2002 deaths
Military personnel from The Hague
Dutch resistance members
Dutch activists
Dutch Muslims
Dutch rebels
Royal Netherlands Army personnel
Indonesian prisoners and detainees
20th-century Indonesian lawyers
Dutch human rights activists
Indonesian human rights activists
Indonesian former Christians
Indonesian Muslims
Prisoners and detainees of Indonesia
Dutch people imprisoned abroad
Dutch guerrillas
Dutch people of the Indonesian National Revolution
Members of the People's Representative Council, 1955
20th-century rebels
Naturalised citizens of Indonesia
Dutch emigrants to Indonesia
Converts to Islam from Roman Catholicism
Former Roman Catholics